Laguna del Maule is a volcanic field in the Andes mountain range of Chile, close to, and partly overlapping, the Argentina–Chile border. The bulk of the volcanic field is in the Talca Province of Chile's Maule Region. It is a segment of the Southern Volcanic Zone, part of the Andean Volcanic Belt. Volcanic activity has generated cones, lava domes, lava coulees and lava flows, which surround the Laguna del Maule lake. The field gets its name from the lake, which is also the source of the Maule River.

The field's volcanic activity began 1.5million years ago during the Pleistocene epoch; such activity has continued into the postglacial and Holocene epoch after glaciers retreated from the area. Postglacial volcanic activity has included eruptions with simultaneous explosive and effusive components, as well as eruptions with only one component. In the postglacial era, volcanic activity has increased at Laguna del Maule, with the volcanic field rapidly inflating during the Holocene. Three major caldera-forming eruptions took place in the volcanic field prior to the last glacial period. The most recent eruptions in the volcanic field took place ,  and  ago and generated lava flows; today geothermal phenomena occur at Laguna del Maule. Volcanic rocks in the field include basalt, andesite, dacite and rhyolite; the latter along with rhyodacite makes up most of the Holocene rocks. In pre-Columbian times, the field was a regionally important source of obsidian.

Between 2004 and 2007, ground inflation began in the volcanic field, indicating the intrusion of a sill beneath it. The rate of inflation is faster than those measured on other inflating volcanoes such as Uturunku in Bolivia and Yellowstone Caldera in the United States and has been accompanied by anomalies in soil gas emission and seismic activity. This pattern has created concern about the potential for impending large-scale eruptive activity.

Geography and structure 
The Laguna del Maule volcanic field straddles the Chilean–Argentine frontier; most of the complex lies on the Chilean side. The locality belongs to the Maule Region, of Talca Province in the Andes mountain range; it is close to the confluence of the Maule and Campanario rivers in the Maule valley. Otherwise, the region is sparsely inhabited and economic activity is limited to oil prospecting, pastures and tourism.

Over  of the field is covered by these volcanic rocks. A number of Quaternary volcanic systems of various ages surround Laguna del Maule lake, including about 14 shield volcanoes and stratovolcanoes that have been degraded by glaciation.

Among the structures in the volcanic field, the Domo del Maule lava dome is of rhyolitic composition and generated a lava flow to the north that dammed the Laguna del Maule. Crystals within the flow reflect the sunlight. The well-preserved  lava flow is in the extreme southwest sector of the volcanic field and originates at a tuff cone.

Past glaciation of this part of the Andes left traces in adjacent valleys, such as their U-shaped or trench-shaped outline. The older volcanics of Laguna del Maule have been disproportionately eroded by glacial action. Slopes around Laguna del Maule lake are covered by colluvium including talus.

The name of the volcanic field comes from the lake; the Maule river originates there and the Barrancas River has its headwaters in the volcanic field as well. When the dam broke 9,400years ago, a lake outburst flood occurred that released  of water and left traces, such as scour, in the down-valley gorge. Benches and beach bars developed on the lake, which has left a shoreline around Laguna del Maule lake. The lake is regulated by a dam at the outlet that was built in 1950 and completed in 1957; it is Chile's fourth-largest reservoir with a capacity of  but its surface area has been declining since the mid-2000s by almost 10 percent between 1984 and 2020. Additionally, tephra fallout such as from the 1932 Quizapu eruption has impacted the lake through the Holocene and affected life in the lake waters.

Besides Laguna del Maule, other lakes in the field are Laguna El Piojo on the Chilean side in the southwest sector of the field, Laguna Cari Launa on the Chilean side in the northeastern sector of the field, and Laguna Fea in the south at  elevation and Laguna Negra lake both on the Argentine side. Laguna Fea is dammed by a pumice dam and currently lacks an outlet. The Laguna Sin Salida ("lake without exit"; so named because it lacks a river running out of it) is in the northeastern sector of the volcanic field and it formed within a glacial cirque.

Geology 
This subduction process is responsible for growth of the Chilean Andes, and volcanic and geothermal manifestations such as the 1960 Valdivia earthquake and the 2010 Chile earthquake, as well as Laguna del Maule, which formed  behind the volcanic arc.

A phase of strong volcanic activity began in the Andes 25million years ago, probably due to increased convergence rates of the Nazca and South America plates over the past 28million years. It is likely that this phase has persisted without interruption until today.

The part of the volcanic belt named the Southern Volcanic Zone contains at least 60volcanoes with historical activity and three major caldera systems. Major volcanoes of the Southern Volcanic Zone include from north to south: Maipo, Cerro Azul, Calabozos, Tatara-San Pedro, Laguna del Maule, Antuco, Villarrica, Puyehue-Cordón Caulle, Osorno, and Chaitén. Volcanoes in this segment are typically located on basement blocks that have been uplifted between extensional basins.

During the Late Miocene, the convergence rate was higher than today and the Malargüe fold belt formed east of the main chain in response. The Moho is found at depths of  beneath the volcanic field.

Local 
The Campanario Formation is 15.3 to 7million years old and forms much of the basement in the Laguna del Maule area; this geological formation contains andesitic-dacitic ignimbrites and tuffs with later dacitic dykes that were emplaced  years ago. An older unit, of Jurassic–Cretaceous age, crops out northwest of the volcanic field. Other units include an Oligocene–Miocene group of lacustrine and fluvial formations named Cura-Mallín, and another intermediary formation named Trapa-Trapa, which is of volcanic origin and between 19and 10million years old. Remnants of Quaternary ignimbrites and Pliocene, early Quaternary volcanic centres, are also found around the field; they form the Cola del Zorro Formation, which is partly covered by the eruption products of Laguna del Maule. Glacial tills occur at the volcanic field.

Faults such as the Troncoso Fault lie within the southwest sector of the volcanic field. Troncoso is alternatively described as a strike-slip or as a normal fault; it separates distinct regimes of tectonic and volcanic activity within the Laguna del Maule volcanic field. Faults have been imaged in lake sediments. Other north–south cutting faults are found within the Campanario Formation and the tectonic Las Loicas Trough is associated with Laguna del Maule and passes southeast of it. Some faults at Laguna del Maule may be linked to the northern termination of the Liquiñe-Ofqui Fault Zone.

The volcanoes Nevado de Longaví, Tatara-San Pedro and the caldera Rio Colorado lie west of Laguna del Maule; the latter two may be part of a volcano alignment with Laguna del Maule. More distant are the Calabozos caldera and a late Pleistocene system with domes and flows south of Cerro San Francisquito, which are both silicic volcanic systems. The activity of Tatara-San Pedro and Laguna del Maule with the presence of rhyolite may be influenced by the subduction of the Mocha Fracture Zone, which projects in the direction of these volcanic centres. Nearby are the Risco Bayo and Huemul plutons, which are about 6.2million years old and may have formed through volcanism similar to that of Laguna del Maule.

Composition of erupted rocks 
Laguna del Maule has erupted andesite, basaltic andesite, basalt, dacite, rhyodacite and rhyolite, the andesites and basaltic andesites define a rock suite with medium potassium contents. In the Loma de Los Espejos rocks a  content of 75.6–76.7% by weight has been noted. After deglaciation, the composition of Laguna del Maule volcanic rocks has grown more silicic; since 19,000years ago, andesite eruptions have been restricted to the edges of the volcanic field, consistent with the maturation of a silicic magmatic system. Laguna del Maule magmas contain large amounts of water and carbon dioxide; postglacial magmas on average consist of 56% water by weight with some variation between individual eruptions. Flushing of the magma with carbon dioxide may be important for starting eruptions.

Several stratigraphic units have been distinguished at the volcanic field, including the Valley unit exposed in the Maule valley and the Lake unit found around the lake. The Valley unit's rocks are basaltic andesite. Plagioclase and, in lesser measure, clinopyroxene and olivine form its phenocrysts. The Lake unit is mostly postglacial and includes glassy rhyolite, which is poor in crystals. Phenocrysts in the postglacial rocks are biotite, plagioclase and quartz. Mafic rocks occur as discrete rock fragments in the rhyolitic units erupted by the rdm eruption. Microlites in the Lake unit rocks include biotite, plagioclase and spinel. Variable vesicular texture has been noted on rocks erupted during different eruptions. The Holocene rhyolites are glassy and contain few crystals. Hydrothermal alteration has been reported at various sites, generating alunite, calcite, halite, illite, jarosite, kaolinite, montmorillonite, opal, quartz, smectite, sulfur, travertine and zeolite.

The postglacial rocks are composed of similar elements. High aluminium (Ai) and low titanium (Ti) are present in the basaltic andesite and basalt, a typical pattern for basic rocks in zones where plates converge. The rocks overall belong to the calc-alkaline series, although some iron-rich rocks have been attributed to the tholeiitic series. Strontium (Sr) isotope ratios have been compared to the ones of Tronador volcano; additional compositional similarity is found to other volcanoes close to Laguna del Maule such as Cerro Azul and Calabozos. Laguna del Maule stands out for the frequency of rhyolitic rocks, compared to volcanoes farther south in the chain. There are compositional trends in the region of the volcanic arc between 33° and 42°; more northerly volcanoes are more andesitic in composition while to the south basalts are more frequent.

Magma genesis 
The postglacial activity appears to originate from a shallow silicic magma chamber beneath the caldera. Research published in 2017 by Anderson et al. indicates that this system is somewhat heterogeneous with distinct compositions of magmas erupted in the northwesterly and southeasterly parts of the volcanic field. The early post-glacial rhyodacites contain mafic inclusions implying that mafic lavas exist but do not reach the surface. From Sr isotope ratios it has been inferred that the magma is of deep origin, and the rare-earth element composition shows no evidence of crustal contamination. Neodymium (Nd) and Sr isotope ratios indicate all rocks are derived from the same parent source, with the rhyolites forming by fractional crystallization of the basic magma, similar to the postulated origins of rocks from the Central Volcanic Zone. Partial melting may also be the source of the rhyolites. Overall the environment where the rocks formed appears to be an oxidized  hot system that formed over 100,000 to 200,000years, and was influenced by the injection of basaltic magma. The rhyolitic melts may originate in a crystal rich mush beneath the volcanic field and probably in at least two magma chambers. The magma remains in the chamber for days or weeks before erupting. A minimum long-term magma supply rate of  has been estimated, with a rate of  during the past 20,000years.

Obsidian
In pre-Columbian times, Laguna del Maule was an important source of obsidian for the region, on both sides of the Andes. Obsidian forms sharp edges and was used by ancient societies for the production of projectiles as well as cutting instruments. In South America, obsidian was traded over large distances. Obsidian has been found in the Arroyo El Pehuenche, Laguna Negra and Laguna del Maule localities. These sites yield obsidians with varying properties, from large blocks at Laguna del Maule to smaller pebbles probably carried by water at Arroyo El Pehuenche. Another scheme has a Laguna del Maule 1 source at Laguna Fea and Laguna Negra and a Laguna del Maule 2 source on the Barrancas river.

Climate and vegetation 

Laguna del Maule lies at the interface between a semi-arid, temperate climate and a colder montane climate. Most of the lake water comes from snowmelt; for much of the year the landscape around the lake is covered with snow and storms and snowfall frequently impede traffic at the lake.

The area of Laguna del Maule was glaciated during the last glacial period. Probably due to changes in the position of the Westerlies, after  23,000years ago the glaciers retreated above Laguna del Maule. The glaciation has left moraines and terraces in the area, with undulating hills lying close to the outlet of the lake. Other climate changes in the Holocene such as the Little Ice Age are recorded from sediments in Laguna del Maule, such as a humid period in the 15th to 19th centuries and drought during the early and middle Holocene. Since the 2010, a long drought has caused a decline in the level of Laguna del Maule.

The landscape around Laguna del Maule is mostly desertic without trees. Vegetation around Laguna del Maule is principally formed by cushion plants and sub-shrubs; at higher altitudes vegetation is more scattered. The rocks around Laguna del Maule host a plant named Leucheria graui, which has not been found elsewhere.

Eruptive history 

Laguna del Maule has been active since 1.5million years ago. Its average magma volcanic output rate has been estimated to be —comparable to other volcanic arc systems. Eruptions occur about every 1,000 years and it has been inferred that eruptions lasted between 100 and more than 3,000days. Eruptions include both caldera-forming events and eruptions that did not leave a caldera.

Three caldera-forming events have occurred during the system's lifespan. The first took place 1.5million years ago and produced the dacitic Laguna Sin Puerto ignimbrite, which is exposed northwest of Laguna del Maule lake. The second occurred between 990,000 and 950,000years ago and produced the Bobadilla caldera and a rhyodacitic ignimbrite, also known as the Cajones de Bobadilla ignimbrite. The third took place 336,000years ago and produced the welded Cordon Constanza ignimbrite.

The 36 rhyodacitic lava domes and flows which surround the lake were erupted from about 24individual vents. The eruptions began 25,000years ago, after the onset of deglaciation, and continued until the last such eruption approximately 2,000years ago. After deglaciation 23,000–19,000years ago, two pulses of volcanism occurred at Laguna del Maule, the first 22,500–19,000years ago and the second in the middle-late Holocene.

The  centre became active circa  before present and was the main site of volcanic activity between 14,500 and about 8,000years ago. These two phases of volcanic activity occurred within 9,000years of each other and the magmas involved may have been sourced from different magma reservoirs.

Undated postglacial units are andesitic  scoria cone and lava flow just west of Laguna del Maule, andesitic  on the southeastern shore of Laguna del Maule, rhyolitic  at Laguna del Maule and rhyodacitic  (unit rcd) in the western part of the field. This rhyolitic flare-up is unprecedented the history of the volcanic field, and it is the largest such event in the southern Andes and on a global scale only the Mono-Inyo Craters and Taupo rival it. It took place in two stages, a first early after deglaciation and a second during the Holocene, which featured magmas with distinct composition. Compared to the pre-glacial volcanism, post-glacial activity has been concentrated around Laguna del Maule.

The former two are andesitic, while the latter is a pyroclastic cone. Mafic volcanism appears to have decreased after glacial times at Laguna del Maule, probably because such magmas were hindered from ascending by a more silicic magma system, and the post-glacial volcanism has a mainly silicic composition. The magma chamber acts as a trap for mafic magma, preventing it from rising to the surface and thus explaining the absence of postglacial mafic volcanism.

Explosive eruptions and far-field effects 

Explosive activity including ash and pumice has accompanied a number of the postglacial eruptions; the largest is associated with Los Espejos and has been dated to 23,000years ago. Other such explosive events have been dated at 7,000, 4,000 and 3,200years ago by radiocarbon dating. About three Plinian eruptions and three smaller explosive eruptions have been identified at Laguna del Maule; most of them took place between 7,000 and 3,000years ago. It has been estimated that the ash and pumice deposits have a volume comparable with that of the lava flows.

Other tephras that possibly were erupted at Laguna del Maule have been found in Argentinian archaeological sites, one  ago at El Manzano and another  to  old at Cañada de Cachi. However, there is no evidence for long-term depopulation of affected regions after eruptions.

Most recent activity and geothermal system 

No eruptions have occurred during historical time, but petroglyphs in Valle Hermoso may depict volcanic activity at Laguna del Maule.

Laguna del Maule is geothermally active, featuring bubbling pools, fumaroles and hot springs. There is no degassing at the surface but emission of gas bubbles has been observed in Laguna del Maule lake and a creek southwest of the lake. In the Troncoso valley,  emissions have killed small animals. Hot springs occur mainly north and northeast of Laguna del Maule. The Baños del Maule hot springs are now submerged below the lake. The Baños Campanario hydrothermal springs lie northwest from Laguna del Maule and their waters together with these from the Termas del Medano springs appear to form through a mixing of magmatic and precipitation water. The field has been evaluated as a potential source of geothermal energy. It and the neighbouring Tatara-San Pedro volcano form the so-called Mariposa geothermal system discovered in 2009, whose temperature has been estimated on the basis of gas chemistry to be  and which features fumaroles.

Possible future eruptions 
The Laguna del Maule volcanic system is undergoing strong deformation; uplift between 2004 and 2007 attracted the attention of the global scientific community after it was detected by radar interferometry. A change in the deformation pattern occurred in 2013 related to an earthquake swarm that January, with deformation slowing through to mid-2014 but with another increase between 2016 and at least 2020. Other actively deforming dormant volcanoes in the world are Lazufre in Chile, Santorini in Greece from 2011 to 2012, and Yellowstone Caldera in the United States at a rate of 1/7th that of Laguna del Maule. Another South American volcano, Uturunku in Bolivia has been inflating at a pace 1/10th that of Laguna del Maule's. There is evidence that earlier deformations occurred at Laguna del Maule, with the lake shores having risen by about  during the Holocene possibly as a consequence of about  entering the magmatic system and accumulating in the area of the Barrancas vents.

The present-day uplift is centred beneath the western segment of the ring of post-glacial lava domes, more specifically beneath the southwest sector of the lake. The rate of volume change increased between 2011 and 2012. ,  of magma are estimated to enter the magma chamber. This volume change is approximately 10 to 100 times as large as the field's long-term magma supply rate. The presence of a sill is also supported by magnetotelluric measurements indicating conductivity anomalies at depths of  beneath the western side of the volcanic field and at  depth beneath its northern part. They show the existence of rhyolitic melt, but they do not show a magmatic system associated with the southeastern vents, leaving their magma supply route uncertain. The existence of a Bouguer gravity anomaly also indicates the presence of a low-density body  beneath the volcano, and several low-density bodies below the lake, the eastern vents and the Barrancas centre. The latter may be a trace of magma left behind by the Holocene eruptions there. Seismic tomography has found a  magma reservoir centered beneath the northwestern part of the lake, at  depth. It may contain about 5% melt and has a heterogeneous structure with varying melt fractions in various parts of the reservoir. A reservoir of crystal-rich mush estimated as having a volume of 115 cubic kilometres (28 cu mi), with about 30 cubic kilometres (7.2 cu mi) of magma embedded within the mush, may have moved away from the old vents towards its present-day position. It is being resupplied by deeper, more crystal-poor magmas. In the deep crust, further magma systems may connect Laguna del Maule with Tatara-San Pedro volcano.

Seismicity 

Strong seismic activity has accompanied the deformation at Laguna del Maule. A magnitude 5.5 earthquake occurred south of the volcanic field in June 2012. A major volcano-tectonic earthquake swarm occurred in January 2013, possibly due to faults and underground liquids being pressurized by the intrusion of magma. Between 2011 and 2014, swarms of earthquakes occurred every two or three months and lasted from half an hour to three hours. Afterwards activity decreased until 2017 and increased again, with the most intense seismic episode taking place in June 2020. Most earthquake activity appears to be of volcano-tectonic origin, while fluid flow is less important; two intersecting lineaments on the southwest corner of the lake appear to be involved. Although some shallow earthquakes have been interpreted as reflecting diking and faulting on the magma chamber, the pressure within the chamber appears to be insufficient to trigger a rupture all the way between the surface and the chamber and thus no eruption has occurred yet.

Potential mechanisms for the uplift 

Several mechanisms have been proposed for the inflation, including the movement of magma underground, the injection of new magma, or the action of volcanic gases and volatiles which are released by the magma. Carbon dioxide anomalies, concentrated on the northern lakeshore, have been found around Laguna del Maule, in 2020 together with dead animals and discoloured soil; the anomalies are possibly triggered by the stress of the inflation activating old faults. These anomalies may indicate that the inflation is of mafic composition, as rhyolite only poorly dissolves . Gravity change measurements also show an interaction between magma source, faults and the hydrothermal system.

Hazards and management 

This uplift has been a cause of concern in light of the history of explosive activity of the volcanic field, with 50eruptions in the last 20,000 years; the current uplift may be the prelude of a large rhyolitic eruption. In particular, the scarce fumarolic activity implies that a large amount of gas is trapped within the magma reservoir, increasing the hazard of an explosive eruption. It is not clear if such an eruption would fit the pattern set by Holocene eruptions or would be a larger event. The prospect of renewed volcanic activity at Laguna del Maule has caused concern among the authorities and inhabitants of the region. A major eruption would have a serious impact on Argentina and Chile, including the formation of lava domes, lava flows, pyroclastic flows near the lake, ash fall at larger distances and lahars. The international road across Paso Pehuenche and air traffic in the region could be endangered by renewed eruptions. A break-out flood from Laguna Fea may endanger communities downstream.

Laguna del Maule is considered to be one of the most dangerous volcanoes of the Southern Andean volcanic belt, and is Argentina's third most dangerous volcano. In March 2013, the Southern Andean Volcano Observatory declared a "yellow alert" for the volcano in light of the deformation and earthquake activity and which is still active ; the alert was supplemented afterwards with an "early" warning (withdrawn in January 2017). The Argentine Servicio Geológico Minero and the Chilean National Geology and Mining Service monitor the volcano with a network of stations, and a bi-national volcanic hazard map has been published.

Notes

References

Bibliography

External links 

 Laguna del Maule by Chile's Servicio Nacional de Geología (in Spanish)
 Article about Laguna del Maule in the journal Andean Geology
 "Evolution of a large, hot, restless rhyolitic magma system at Laguna del Maule", IAVCEI Assembly 2013
 SEGEMAR webpage

Calderas of Chile
Mountains of Chile
Volcanoes of Maule Region